Hurricane Iota was the second-most powerful November tropical cyclone on record in the Atlantic basin, behind only the 1932 Cuba hurricane. It was also the strongest and most intense hurricane of the hyperactive 2020 Atlantic hurricane season. At the end of October, a tropical wave emerged off Africa and traversed the Atlantic Ocean with little note. The system later impacted northern South America and the Lesser Antilles before becoming more organized, eventually becoming a tropical depression on November 13 over the Caribbean Sea. Initially stymied by adverse environmental conditions the system, which soon became Tropical Storm Iota, struggled to organize as it took an atypical southwest track. After developing a small, well-organized core, Iota entered region exceptionally favorable for explosive intensification and dramatically developed. Within a 42-hour period from November 15 to 16, Iota strengthened from a tropical storm to a high-end Category 4 hurricane with peak winds of 155 mph (250 km/h). The hurricane's eyewall impacted the Colombian islands of Providencia and Santa Catalina around this time. Moving along a westward course, Iota slowly weakened and eventually made landfall in Nicaragua with winds of 145 mph (230 km/h) in nearly the same location as Hurricane Eta two weeks prior. Once inland, interaction with the region's mountainous terrain caused the system to rapidly deteriorate and its surface circulation dissipated on November 18. Its remnants persisted another day before last being noted southwest of Guatemala.

Iota bolstered records set during the 2020 Atlantic hurricane season and became one of the fastest intensifying hurricanes ever observed. Its rate of intensification in a 42-hour period was only exceeded by Hurricanes Rita and Wilma in 2005. The compounding devastation it caused just two weeks after Eta led to the retirement of the letter Iota in 2021. Collectively, the two hurricanes killed at least 259 people and inflicted more than $9 billion in damage.

Origins

A low-latitude (below 10°N) tropical wave exited the coast of West Africa over the Atlantic Ocean on October 30, 2020. Scattered convection accompanied the wave as it moved west over open waters. On November 7–8, the wave turned northwest and traversed northern South America, crossing Guyana, Venezuela, and the Windward Islands before emerging over the Caribbean Sea. Largely favorable environmental conditions ahead of the disturbance led to the National Hurricane Center (NHC) issuing outlooks for potential cyclogenesis at this time. Turning back to the west and slowing, interaction with an upper-level trough fostered the development and expansion of convection. Strong wind shear inhibited organization as the system approached Hispaniola on November 10–11; however, the system made an unusual turn southwest in response to a mid-level ridge over the southwestern Atlantic and a surface low developed by 12:00 UTC on November 12. Lessening wind shear in this region enabled convection to concentrate around the center of the low and the system became a tropical depression, the record-tying thirty-first of the season, approximately 185 mi (295 km) northwest of Aruba. The depression strengthened into Tropical Storm Iota six hours later, bolstering the already record-breaking number of named storms during the 2020 season to 30.

Throughout November 13, minimal intensification occurred as Iota remained a broad system with its surface- and mid-level circulations disjointed. However, unexpected localized moderate shear and Iota's proximity to Colombia kept the cyclone disorganized. As Iota moved farther from land on November 14, banding features became more pronounced and deep convection blossomed over a tightening circulation.

Explosive intensification
With Iota becoming more compact and organized within the aforementioned favorable conditions and shear relaxing, the system underwent an exceptional period of explosive intensification from 18:00 UTC on November 14 to 12:00 UTC on November 16. The environment surrounding Iota was ideal for this to occur: wind shear fell below , lower- to mid-level relative humidity values exceeded 70 percent, and SSTs averaged . A symmetrical central dense overcast with temperatures averaging  and broad outflow developed on November 15. Data from the 53rd Weather Reconnaissance Squadron revealed Iota to have become a hurricane by 06:00 UTC that day, the 14th such storm of the season. This was the second-highest number of hurricanes in a single season since reliable records began, just shy of the 15 in 2005. Iota's core wobbled northwest at the onset of this intensification as the overall trajectory shifted west in response to a strengthening ridge spanning from the western Atlantic to the Gulf of Mexico. A ragged eye formed throughout the latter part of November 15 as the system became co-located with an upper-level anticyclone.

The most rapid phase of intensification occurred early on November 16 during which a 6-hour pressure drop of 26 mbar (hPa; 0.76 mbar), including a drop of 10 mbar (hPa; 0.29 inHg) in a single hour, was observed by aircraft reconnaissance. Though not fully understood, hypotheses at the time propose that eyewall mesovortices can create intense hot towers with strong updrafts capable of more efficiently transporting mass out of the eye. This in turn hastens the rate of intensification. The mesovortices later degraded into a single, intense cell that remained in the southern eyewall through Iota's landfall in Nicaragua. Between 00:00 and 06:00 UTC, Iota became a major hurricane, the record-tying seventh of the season,
 and reached Category 4 intensity by 06:00 UTC. It is estimated the islands experienced sustained winds of at least 130 mph (215 km/h).

The hurricane's exceptional intensification ended at 12:00 UTC on November 16 with it acquiring maximum sustained winds of 155 mph (250 km/h) and a minimum pressure of 917 mbar (hPa; 27.08 inHg). This made Iota the second-most intense November hurricane on record, only behind the 1932 Cuba hurricane. Iota's intensification was one of the fastest on record in the Atlantic basin. During the 42-hour period from 18:00 UTC on November 14 to 12:00 UTC on November 16, its central pressure fell by 80 mbar (hPa; 2.36 inHg) and its maximum sustained winds rose by 105 mph (165 km/h). The pressure fall in this time span was the third-greatest on record, only behind 2005's Rita (93 mbar (hPa; 2.74 inHg)) and Wilma (105 mbar (hPa; 3.10 inHg)).

This would have made it the latest such storm during a calendar year on record in the basin and the only category 5 hurricane of the season. However, in post-analysis the NHC determined the SFMR values to have a high bias as the highest observations were coupled with lower flight-level winds, a problem that had recently been discovered with other intense hurricanes. NHC meteorologists determined that breaking waves along the west side of Providencia and Santa Catalina interfered with the instruments measurement quality. Accordingly, the peak intensity was revised downward to 155 mph (250 km/h); however, this was within the normal range of uncertainty. Meteorologists noted that research into these errors is ongoing and the peak intensity of Iota could be revised in future analysis.

Landfall and dissipation

After reaching its peak strength on November 16, Iota slowly weakened on approach to Nicaragua. Lower sea surface temperatures and ocean heat content, likely the result of upwelling from Hurricane Eta, caused convection to diminish and its eye structure to deteriorate. Around 03:40 UTC on November 17, Iota made landfall near the small village of Haulover, Nicaragua (about 25 mi (40 km) south-southwest of Bilwi) with estimated winds of 145 mph (230 km/h). In the hours leading up to the hurricane's landfall on November 17 there were no reconnaissance missions and Iota's intensity is uncertain. Furthermore, land-based measurements were nearly non-existent given the devastation wrought by Eta.

Once inland, Iota rapidly weakened over the mountainous terrain of Nicaragua and Honduras. Convection dramatically warmed, though the hurricane maintained a small core several hours after landfall. Based on calculations using the SHIPS inland decay model, Iota is estimated to have degraded to a tropical storm by 18:00 UTC near the Nicaragua-Honduras border. By the start of November 18, the remaining deep convection was confined to a rainband well to the northwest of the storm's core. Scatterometer data indicate the system continued producing tropical storm-force winds off the northern coast of Honduras throughout the morning. After weakening to a tropical depression by 12:00 UTC, the surface circulation of Iota dissipated over east-central El Salvador several hours later; however, its mid-level remnant continued west and soon connected to a monsoon trough. The system was last noted the following day well to the southwest of Guatemala.

Notes

References

Meteorological histories of individual tropical cyclones
2020 Atlantic hurricane season
Tropical cyclones in 2020